Noun Borey (born 5 August 1996) is a Cambodian footballer who plays for the National Police Commissary in the Cambodian League and the Cambodia national football team. He made his international debut in a friendly match against Singapore on 17 November 2014.

References

1996 births
Living people
Cambodian footballers
Cambodia international footballers
Sportspeople from Phnom Penh
Association football forwards
Competitors at the 2017 Southeast Asian Games
Southeast Asian Games competitors for Cambodia
21st-century Cambodian people